Douglas Graber (born September 26, 1944) is a former American football coach. He graduated from Wayne State University (1966) in Detroit, Michigan. He began his coaching career at St. Frances Cabrini Elementary School and High School in Allen Park, Michigan. He served as the head football coach at Montana State University in 1982 and at Rutgers University – New Brunswick from 1990 to 1995, compiling a career college football record of 35–41–1. Graber was also the head coach of the Frankfurt Galaxy of NFL Europe from 2001 to 2003. He led the Galaxy to an overall record of 16–15, including a World Bowl XI championship.

Coaching career

Montana State
Graber got his first collegiate head coaching job on December 16, 1981, when he was hired by Montana State University. During his only season in Bozeman, he led the Bobcats to a 6–5 overall record and a tie for the first place in the Big Sky Conference with a 5–2 league record. He left the school in February 1983 to become an assistant coach with the Kansas City Chiefs of the National Football League.

National Football League
Graber was a member of the Chiefs' staff for four seasons, working for head coach John Mackovic. He handled defensive quality control duties during his first year, while also helping defensive coordinator Bud Carson coach the defensive backs. In August 1984, Carson resigned and Graber took over coaching the secondary.

Frankfurt Galaxy
After a five-year hiatus from coaching, Graber was hired as the head coach of NFL Europe's Frankfurt Galaxy on September 18, 2000. He became the fourth coach in team history, succeeding Jack Elway (1991–1992), Ernie Stautner (1995–1997) and Dick Curl (1998–2000). In his first year at the helm, the Galaxy finished sixth in the league with a record of 3–7.

Head coaching record

College

Professional

References

1944 births
Living people
Ball State Cardinals football coaches
Eastern Michigan Eagles football coaches
Frankfurt Galaxy coaches
Kansas City Chiefs coaches
Michigan Tech Huskies football coaches
Montana State Bobcats football coaches
New York Jets coaches
Rutgers Scarlet Knights football coaches
Tampa Bay Buccaneers coaches
Wisconsin Badgers football coaches
High school football coaches in Michigan
Sportspeople from Detroit